The 1874 Philadelphia Athletics finished in third place in the National Association with a record of 33-22. Dick McBride pitched all of the team's innings and led the league with a 1.64 earned run average.

Regular season

Season standings

Record vs. opponents

Roster

Player stats

Batting

Starters by position
Note: Pos = Position; G = Games played; AB = At bats; H = Hits; Avg. = Batting average; HR = Home runs; RBI = Runs batted in

Other batters
Note: G = Games played; AB = At bats; H = Hits; Avg. = Batting average; HR = Home runs; RBI = Runs batted in

Pitching

Starting pitchers
Note: G = Games pitched; IP = Innings pitched; W = Wins; L = Losses; ERA = Earned run average; SO = Strikeouts

References
1874 Philadelphia Athletics season at Baseball Reference

Philadelphia Athletics (1860–1876) seasons
Philadelphia Athletics Season, 1874